Charter pour l'enfer (also known as Charters to Hell) is a 1981 French documentary film directed by Jean-Pierre Moscardo.

Awards

References

External links 
 Official website

1981 films
French documentary films
1980s French films